is one of the original 40 throws of Judo as developed by Jigoro Kano.  It belongs to the fourth group, Yonkyo, of the traditional throwing list, Gokyo (no waza), of Kodokan Judo.  It is also part of the current 67 Throws of Kodokan Judo.
It is classified as a side sacrifice technique, Yoko-sutemi.

See also
The Canon Of Judo

References

Judo technique
Grappling
Grappling hold
Grappling positions
Martial art techniques